Trinity Episcopal School may refer to:

Trinity Episcopal School New Orleans, Louisiana
Trinity Episcopal Day School, Mississippi
Trinity Episcopal School of Austin, Texas
Trinity Episcopal School (Galveston), Texas
Trinity Episcopal School (Virginia), Virginia

See also
 Trinity School (disambiguation)